is a 1958 Japanese film directed by Shōhei Imamura. It was Imamura's debut as a director.

Cast 
 Osamu Takizawa as Taminosuke Yamamura
 Shinichi Yanagisawa as Ezaburo Yamamura
 Hiroyuki Nagato as Shinichi Kunida
 Kō Nishimura as Kanji Takada
 Toshio Takahara as Eisuke Katō
 Shojiro Ogasawara as Tominachiro Kobayashi
 Tomio Aoki
 Nobuo Kawakami as Policeman
 Hayao Takamura

References

External links
 
 
 

1958 films
Films directed by Shohei Imamura
Nikkatsu films
1958 directorial debut films
1950s Japanese films